Special Squad is a 1995 Indian Malayalam film, directed by Krishnadas. The film stars Babu Antony and Charmila in the lead roles. The film has musical score by Mohan Sithara.

Plot

Sibi Mathew (Babu Antony) is appointed as custom officer in a tough place where Fernandez (Rajan P Dev) with his sons do smuggling and live. Rajan Varghese (Captain Raju) is the chief of customs. His daughter Shirley(Charmila) gets attracted to Sibi. Finally Sibi and Shirley get married. Sibi raids Fernandez's factory and removes many illegal items. Fernandez's son Freddy (Kundara Johnny) fights with Sibi and gets killed. Sibi get arrested and in court, many false witness testify against Sibi. Sibi is sentenced to life imprisonment. Fernandez's sons Bony (Ramu) and Martin (Mahesh) now chase Charmila, rape and kill her. Fernandez now stops smuggling and enters politics. Sibi, full of grief and anger, escapes jail and first enters Thripunithara's house where Thripunithara confesses that the files they got from the raid were handed back to Fernandez by Vasudevan Nair( M. S Thripunithara ), which became vital in the case against Sibi. Sibi next kills Martin by running the car over him. Finally, Sibi catches Freddy, who was shown killed. Freddy confesses that it was Fernandez's plan to kill a news leaker from their group and put it as a dead body. Freddy, after confessing, runs into Fernandez's area. Now Siby fights with all and kills everybody.

Cast
Babu Antony as Sibi Mathew
Charmila as Shirley
Ramu as Bony
Mala Aravindan as Kochaugusty
Kundara Johny as Freddy
Baburaj as Chandrappan
Rajan P. Dev as Fernandez
Chithra as Alice
Captain Raju as Customs Collector Rajan Varghese
Mahesh as Martin
N. F. Varghese as Hameed
Zainuddin as Murugan
Geetha Vijayan as Rekha Cheriyan
M. S. Thripunithura as Vasudevan Nair (Dubbing Hari)
Vijayaraghavan as Noufal
Vijayakumar as Simon
Jose Pellissery as Adv. Shivadasa Menon
Bindu Panicker as Sabiya
Mafia Sasi as Gunda
Silk Smitha as Madhumathi
Nikhil as College student
Benny as College student

Soundtrack
The music was composed by Mohan Sithara and the lyrics were written by Mudavanmugal Vasantha Kumari.

References

External links
 

1995 films
1990s Malayalam-language films